Orthodes noverca is a species of cutworm or dart moth in the family Noctuidae first described by Augustus Radcliffe Grote in 1878. It is found in North America.

The MONA or Hodges number for Orthodes noverca is 10282.

References

Further reading

 
 
 

Eriopygini
Articles created by Qbugbot
Moths described in 1878